An aphorism (from Greek ἀφορισμός: aphorismos, denoting 'delimitation', 'distinction', and 'definition') is a concise, terse, laconic, or memorable expression of a general truth or principle. Aphorisms are often handed down by tradition from generation to generation. 

The concept is generally distinct from those of an adage, brocard, chiasmus, epigram, maxim (legal or philosophical), principle, proverb, and saying; although some of these concepts may be construed as types of aphorism. 

Often, aphorisms are distinguished from other short sayings by the need for interpretation to make sense of them. In A Theory of the Aphorism, Andrew Hui defined an aphorism as "a short saying that requires interpretation." 

A famous example is:

History
The word was first used in the Aphorisms of Hippocrates, a long series of propositions concerning the symptoms and diagnosis of disease and the art of healing and medicine. The often cited first sentence of this work  is: "" - "life is short, art is long", usually reversed in order (see Ars longa, vita brevis).

This aphorism was later applied or adapted to physical science and then morphed into multifarious aphorisms of philosophy, morality, and literature. Currently an aphorism is generally understood to be a concise and eloquent statement of truth. 

Aphorisms are distinct from axioms: aphorisms generally originate from experience and custom, whereas axioms are self-evident truths and therefore require no additional proof. Aphorisms have been especially used in subjects to which no methodical or scientific treatment was originally applied, such as agriculture, medicine, jurisprudence and politics.

Literature
Aphoristic collections, sometimes known as wisdom literature, have a prominent place in the canons of several ancient societies, such as the Sutra literature of India, the Biblical Ecclesiastes, Islamic hadiths, the golden verses of Pythagoras, Hesiod's Works and Days, the Delphic maxims, and Epictetus' Handbook.  Aphoristic collections also make up an important part of the work of some modern authors. A 1559 oil–on–oak-panel painting, Netherlandish Proverbs (also called The Blue Cloak or The Topsy Turvy World) by Pieter Bruegel the Elder, artfully depicts a land populated with literal renditions of Flemish aphorisms (proverbs) of the day.

The first noted published collection of aphorisms is Adagia by Erasmus. Other important early aphorists were Baltasar Gracián, François de La Rochefoucauld and Blaise Pascal.

Two influential collections of aphorisms published in the twentieth century were The Uncombed Thoughts by Stanisław Jerzy Lec (in Polish), and Itch of Wisdom by Mikhail Turovsky (in Russian and English).

Society
Many societies have traditional sages or culture heroes to whom aphorisms are commonly attributed, such as the Seven Sages of Greece, Confucius or King Solomon.

Misquoted or misadvised aphorisms are frequently used as a source of humour; for instance, wordplays of aphorisms appear in the works of P. G. Wodehouse, Terry Pratchett and Douglas Adams. Aphorisms being misquoted by sports players, coaches, and commentators form the basis of Private Eye's Colemanballs section.

Philosophy 
Professor of Humanities Andrew Hui, author of A Theory of the Aphorism offered the following definition of an aphorism: "a short saying that requires interpretation." Hui showed that some of the earliest philosophical texts from traditions around the world used an aphoristic style. Some of the earliest texts in the western philosophical canon feature short statements requiring interpretation, as seen in the Pre-Socratics like Heraclitus and Parmenides. In early Hindu literature, the Vedas were composed of many aphorisms. Likewise, in early Chinese philosophy, Taoist texts like the Tao Te Ching and the Confucian Analects relied on an aphoristic style. Francis Bacon, Blaise Pascal, Desiderius Erasmus, and Friedrich Nietzsche rank among some of the most notable philosophers who employed them in the modern era.

Andrew Hui argued that aphorisms played an important role in the history of philosophy, influencing the favored mediums of philosophical traditions. He argued for example, that the Platonic Dialogues served as a response to the difficult to interpret fragments and phrases which Pre-Socratic philosophers were famous for. Hui proposes that aphorisms often arrive before, after, or in response to more systematic argumentative philosophy. For example, aphorisms may come before a systematic philosophy, because the systematic philosophy consists of the attempt to interpret and explain the aphorisms, as he argues is the case with Confucianism. Alternately, aphorisms may be written against systematic philosophy, as a form of challenge or irreverence, as seen in Nietzsche's work. Lastly, aphorisms may come after or following systematic philosophy, as was the case with Francis Bacon, who sought to bring an end to old ways of thinking.

Aphorists 

 Theodor W. Adorno (Minima Moralia: Reflections from Damaged Life)
 Georges Bataille
 Jean Baudrillard
 Ambrose Bierce (The Devil's Dictionary)
 F. H. Bradley
 Emil Cioran
 Arkady Davidowitz
 Nicolás Gómez Dávila
 Malcolm de Chazal
 Desiderius Erasmus
 Gustave Flaubert (Dictionary of Received Ideas)
 Benjamin Franklin
 Andrzej Maksymilian Fredro
 Robert A. Heinlein (The Notebooks of Lazarus Long)
 Edmond Jabès
 Joseph Joubert
 Franz Kafka
 Karl Kraus
 François de La Rochefoucauld
 Stanisław Jerzy Lec
 Georg Christoph Lichtenberg
 Andrzej Majewski
 Juan Manuel (the second, third and fourth parts of his famous work El Conde Lucanor)
 Friedrich Nietzsche
 Oiva Paloheimo
 Dorothy Parker
 Patanjali
 Petar II Petrović-Njegoš
 Faina Ranevskaya
 Arthur Schopenhauer
 Seneca the Younger
 George Bernard Shaw
 Lev Shestov
 Oscar Wilde
 Nassim Nicholas Taleb (The Bed of Procrustes)
 Mikhail Turovsky
 Lao Tze
 Voltaire
 Wasif Ali Wasif
 Mark Miremont
 George Santayana
 Alexander Woollcott
 Burchard of Worms
 Cheng Yen (Jing Si Aphorism)

See also

 Adage
 Adagia by Desiderius Erasmus Roterodamus
 Brocard
 Chiasmus
 Cliché
 Epigram
 Epitaph
 French moralists
 Gospel of Thomas
 Greguería
 Legal maxim
 Mahavakya
 Maxim
 Platitude
 Proverb
 Pseudo-Phocylides
 Sacred Scripture:
 Book of Proverbs
 Ecclesiastes
 Hidden Words
 Wisdom of Sirach
 Saying
 Sūtra
 The Triads of Ireland, and the Welsh Triads

References

Further reading
 
 Gopnik, Adam, "Brevity, Soul, Wit:  The art of the aphorism" (includes discussion of Andrew Hui, A Theory of the Aphorism:  From Confucius to Twitter, Princeton, 2019), The New Yorker, 22 July 2019, pp. 67–69.  "The aphorism [...] is [...] always an epitome, and seeks an essence.  The ability to elide the extraneous is what makes the aphorism bite, but the possibility of inferring backward to a missing text is what makes the aphorism poetic."  (p.69.)

External links

  Commentary on Hippocrates' Aphorisms

 
Narrative techniques
Paremiology
Phrases